Christopher William Parfitt CBE is the chairman and managing director of General Motors UK Ltd., while it was a parent company of Vauxhall Motors.

Biography
Trained as an engineer, Parfitt joined Goodyear in 1972 and was put in charge of initiating and running the Fast Fit operations. Afterwards, he worked at Dorada, Sears, Lex, and Henlys.

In 1998, Parfitt joined General Motors as fleet sales director. Subsequently, he held the positions of Sales and Marketing Director, Managing Director, and Regional Director responsible for Saab, Chevrolet, Cadillac, Corvette, Hummer, and Opel Ireland, as well as Fleet and LCV Sales for General Motors Europe.

Parfitt retired as Chairman & CEO for GMUK which included oversight for Sales & Marketing, the Proving Ground & Test Centre at Millbrook, and the manufacturing facilities at Luton & Ellesmere Port. He continued for some time to undertake senior temporary roles and consulting for GM in Europe.

He was appointed Commander of the Order of the British Empire (CBE) during the 2011 Birthday Honours.

References

External links 
 Vauxhall.co.uk

Opel people
Living people
British businesspeople
Commanders of the Order of the British Empire
Year of birth missing (living people)